Tobias Otieno Omondi (born 25 October 1998) is a Kenyan footballer who plays as a defensive midfielder for South Georgia Tormenta in USL League One.

Career

Union Omaha
Otieno joined USL League One side Union Omaha on 14 January 2020 from Kenyan Premier League side Gor Mahia. He made his debut on 30 September 2020, starting in a 3–2 win away to Fort Lauderdale CF.

South Georgia Tormenta
On 15 February 2022, Otieno signed with USL League One club South Georgia Tormenta.

References

External links
 

1998 births
Living people
Union Omaha players
USL League One players
Kenyan footballers
Association football midfielders
Kenyan expatriate footballers
Kenyan expatriate sportspeople in the United States
Expatriate soccer players in the United States
Tormenta FC players